Bramley may refer to:

People 
 Bramley (surname)

Places

Australia
 Bramley, Western Australia

England
 Bramley, Derbyshire
 Bramley, Hampshire
 Bramley Training Area, a British Army training camp
 Bramley, Rotherham, South Yorkshire
 Bramley, Surrey
 Bramley, Leeds
Bramley Buffaloes, a rugby league club
Bramley R.L.F.C., a defunct rugby league club

South Africa
 Bramley, Gauteng

Other uses 
 Bramley apple, a variety of apple
 "Bramley" is also a term given to a particular shot played in pocket billiards and similar games

See also 
 Bromley (disambiguation)